This article contains a list of mayors of the city of Utica in the U.S. State of New York, in the United States.

List

References 

Utica, New York mayors